The 2002 Arizona Wildcats softball team represented the University of Arizona in the 2002 NCAA Division I softball season.  The Wildcats were coached by Mike Candrea, who led his seventeenth season.  The Wildcats finished with a record of 55–12.  They competed in the Pacific-10 Conference, where they finished second with a 15–6 record.

The Wildcats were invited to the 2002 NCAA Division I softball tournament, where they won their Regional and then completed a run to the title game of the Women's College World Series where they fell to champion California.

Personnel

Roster

Coaches

Schedule

References

Arizona
Arizona Wildcats softball seasons
Arizona Softball
Women's College World Series seasons